Elias Karvonen (born July 28, 1994) is a Finnish professional ice hockey forward currently playing for TPS in the Liiga.

Karvonen began playing for TPS through junior setup in 2010 and made his debut for the senior team during the 2014-15 Liiga season. He also had a brief loan spell with TUTO Hockey of Mestis during the 2016-17 season.

References

External links

1994 births
Living people
Finnish ice hockey forwards
Sportspeople from Turku
HC TPS players
TuTo players